The Robert Award for Best Editing is one of the merit awards presented by the Danish Film Academy at the annual Robert Awards ceremony. The award has been handed out since 1984.

Honorees

1980s 
 1984:  for 
 1985:  for The Element of Crime
 1986: Kasper Schyberg for 
 1987:  for 
 1988:  for Pelle the Conqueror
 1989: Leif Axel Kjeldsen for

1990s 
 1990:  for 
 1991: Leif Axel Kjeldsen for 
 1992: Hervé Schneid for Europa
 1993: Birger Møller Jensen for Pain of Love
 1994:  for The House of the Spirits
 1995: Camilla Skousen for Nightwatch
 1996: Morten Giese for 
 1997: Anders Refn for Breaking the Waves
 1998: Morten Giese, Jakob Thuesen and Per K. Kirkegaard for Eye of the Eagle and Credo
 1999: Valdís Óskarsdóttir for Festen

2000s 
 2000: Valdís Óskarsdóttir for Mifune's Last Song
 2002: Søren B. Ebbe for Kira's Reason: A Love Story
 2003: Pernille Bech Christiansen and Thomas Krag for Open Hearts
 2004: Mikkel E. G. Nielsen and Peter Brandt for Reconstruction
 2005: Mikkel E. G. Nielsen for King's Game
 2006: Kasper Leick for 
 2007:  for Prag
 2008:  for Just Another Love Story
 2009:  for Worlds Apart

2010s 
 2010: Anders Refn for Antichrist
 2011:  for R
 2012:  for Melancholia
 2013:  for A Hijacking
 2015: Molly Malene Stensgaard and Morten Højbjerg for Nymphomaniac Director's Cut

References

External links 
  

1984 establishments in Denmark
Awards established in 1984
Film editing awards
Editing